Robert Ellis Cahill (November 25, 1934 – June 19, 2005) was a folklorist and author. He was the author of more than three dozen books on New England history and folklore, as well as on scuba diving, shipwrecks and pirates.

Politics
Cahill served in the Massachusetts House of Representatives from 1970 to 1975.

In 1974, Cahill was elected Sheriff of Essex County, Massachusetts. During his tenure as Sheriff, Cahill sought to modernize the department. The jails in Salem and Lawrence lacked toilets, which meant inmates had to defecate in buckets. There were also no rehabilitation programs in either jail and guards had no formal training. The minimum-security Correctional Alternative Center in Lawrence opened during Cahill's tenure. While serving as Sheriff, Cahill investigated an alleged curse Giles Corey placed on the office. He found that all Essex County Sheriffs as far back as he could trace either died in office of heart problems or retired due to "an ailment of the blood". In 1978, Cahill, who suffered from a rare blood disorder himself, retired after he suffered a heart attack and stroke.

Writing
Several of Cahill's books center on the infamous Salem Witch Trials and related topics, such as accounts of the Salem "Witch Dungeon" and colonial era crime and punishment. Cahill was born and raised in Salem, Massachusetts and also wrote several auto-biographical books, one recounting his experiences as Sheriff, and another relating tales of his childhood growing up in New England during World War II.

Cahill's most widely distributed lore and histories are mostly in the form of small books that can still be found in large quantities within souvenir shops located at tourist attractions throughout New England.

Published books
New England Collectible Classics (Chandler-Smith Publishing)
New England Witches and Wizards
New England's Ghostly Haunts
New England's Mad and Mysterious Men
New England's Strange Sea Sagas
Finding New England's Shipwrecks and Treasures
New England's War Wonders
New England's Visitors from Outer Space
The Horrors of Salem's Witch Dungeon (The Lauren Robinson Story)"The Old Irish of New EnglandNew England's Naughty NavyNew England's Viking and Indian WarsNew England's Riotous RevolutionNew England's Pirates and Lost TreasureNew England's Mountain MadnessOld Salt Box Publishing House
 Things That Go Bump in the Night Strange Superstitions New England's Ancient Mysteries  Haunted Ships of the North Atlantic  Sugar and Spice Haunted Happenings Amazing Fish Stories  Strange Beliefs, Customs & Superstitions  Christmas Memories   Cruel and Unusual Punishments Curious Customs and Cures Lighthouse Mysteries of the North Atlantic Diary of the Depths  (Dorrance & Company) The Wayward Sheriffs of Witch County  (Old Pine Tree Publishing House) The Balloon Tree: A Memoir of American Kids Growing Up During WWII   (Old Pine Tree Publishing House)Poems
 Col. Leslie's Retreat''

References

External links
 Boston Globe: Robert Ellis Cahill obituary
 Salem Gazette: Robert Cahill: A Key to Salem History
  Salem History Online

American folklorists
Sheriffs of Essex County, Massachusetts
1934 births
2005 deaths
Boston University alumni
Democratic Party members of the Massachusetts House of Representatives
Politicians from Salem, Massachusetts
Writers from Salem, Massachusetts
20th-century American politicians